Mao Kaiyu (born 10 January 1991) is a Chinese footballer currently playing as a centre-back for Changchun Yatai.

Career statistics

Club
.

References

External links

1991 births
Living people
Footballers from Shenyang
Footballers from Liaoning
Chinese footballers
Association football defenders
China League One players
Chinese Super League players
Tianjin Jinmen Tiger F.C. players
Shenyang Dongjin F.C. players
Inner Mongolia Zhongyou F.C. players
Heilongjiang Ice City F.C. players
Changchun Yatai F.C. players
21st-century Chinese people